German submarine U-209 was a Type VIIC U-boat of the Kriegsmarine during World War II. The submarine was laid down on 28 November 1940 by the Friedrich Krupp Germaniawerft yard at Kiel as yard number 638, launched on 28 August 1941 and commissioned on 11 October under the command of Kapitänleutnant Heinrich Brodda.

She was lost in May 1943, possibly due to a diving accident.

Design
German Type VIIC submarines were preceded by the shorter Type VIIB submarines. U-209 had a displacement of  when at the surface and  while submerged. She had two shafts and two  propellers.

U-209 was fitted with five  torpedo tubes (four fitted at the bow and one at the stern), fourteen torpedoes, one  SK C/35 naval gun, 220 rounds, and a  C/30 anti-aircraft gun. The boat had a complement of between forty-four and sixty.

Service history
U-209 began her service career as part of the 6th U-boat Flotilla for training, she then commenced operations with the same organization on 1 March 1942. She was reassigned to the 11th flotilla on 1 July 1942. She was with the 1st flotilla until her loss on 7 May 1943. She carried out a total of seven patrols and was a member of nine wolfpacks.

First patrol
She made the short journey from Kiel to the German island of Helgoland and then departed on her first patrol on 15 March 1942. She headed north, into the Norwegian Sea, then east. The boat was attacked by the armed trawler  on the 28th ; but conditions were so bad that the ship could not use her armament because it was frozen. Depth charges were little better, at least one malfunctioned.

U-209 escaped.

Second patrol
The boat's second sortie began in the Norwegian port of Kirkenes in the far north of the country. She patrolled the vicinity of Bear Island, then sailed south and southwest, before docking in Bergen, also in Norway.

Third and fourth patrols
Her third and fourth patrols, in June and July 1942, covered the Norwegian Sea and the passage between Bear Island and Svalbard, it saw her depart Bergen and return to Kirkenes.

Fifth patrol
The boat attacked a small Soviet convoy on 17 August 1942, near Mateev Island in the eastern Barents Sea. One more tug Nord managed to escape. The P-4 barge was carrying some 300 detained people who worked at the Norilstroi (see Norillag) and almost all drowned.

Sixth and seventh patrols and loss
Patrol number six, at 35 days, was her longest. It took her northwest of Bear Island.

By now the boat had returned to Kiel, from where she departed for the last time on 6 April 1943. She was attacked by a British B-17 Flying Fortress of No. 220 Squadron RAF southeast of Iceland, on the 16th, sustaining damage to her periscope. She was also attacked by a Canadian PBY Catalina (known as a Canso) of No. 5 Squadron RCAF on 4 May. The damage incurred included her radio transmitter, so a message to Bdu (U-boat headquarters), was sent via . U-209 was recalled, but she was never heard from again; her loss might be explained by a diving accident. Whatever the reason, forty-six men died; there were no survivors.

Afterword
U-209 was originally thought to have been sunk by the frigate  and the sloop  on 19 May 1943. U-209 was nicknamed "Brno" by the south Moravian town in where the crew took a holiday in February 1943. They were invited by SS-Sturmbannführer Konrad Nussbaum, chief of Brno Kripo, whose son was one of the crew. Brno municipality received as a gift a model of the submarine (photos exist) but the model itself was probably lost after the end of World War II.

Wolfpacks
U-209 took part in nine wolfpacks, namely:
 Zieten (23 – 29 March 1942) 
 Eiswolf (29 – 31 March 1942) 
 Robbenschlag (7 – 14 April 1942) 
 Blutrausch (15 April 1942) 
 Greif (16 – 29 May 1942) 
 Boreas (19 November - 7 December 1942) 
 Meise (25 – 27 April 1943) 
 Star (27 April - 4 May 1943) 
 Fink (4 – 6 May 1943)

Summary of raiding history

Notes

References

Bibliography

External links

World War II submarines of Germany
German Type VIIC submarines
U-boats commissioned in 1941
U-boats sunk in 1943
1941 ships
Ships built in Kiel
Ships lost with all hands
U-boats sunk by unknown causes
Maritime incidents in May 1943
Missing U-boats of World War II